Artyom Sergeyevich Senkevich (born 4 May 1982) is a Belarusian former professional ice hockey player. He is currently the head coach of the United Arab Emirates national team.

He participated at the 2010 IIHF World Championship as a member of the Belarus National men's ice hockey team.

References

External links

1982 births
Living people
Belarusian ice hockey forwards
HC Dinamo Minsk players
HK Gomel players
Keramin Minsk players
Khimik-SKA Novopolotsk players
Kulager Petropavl players
HK Mogilev players
HC Shakhtyor Soligorsk players
Ice hockey people from Minsk
United Arab Emirates men's national ice hockey team coaches
HK Vitebsk players
Yertis Pavlodar players
Yunost Minsk players